Station wear often refers to the standard uniform worn by firefighters when they are around the station. It usually consists of Nomex uniform pants, a Nomex uniform shirt, and a pair of steel-toed uniform boots. The color of the uniform may differ from department to department. These are often worn under firefighting bunker gear, also referred to as PPEs (personal protective equipment), as an extra layer of protection against fires.

Firefighting equipment
Safety clothing
Workwear